USS Sylph may refer to the following ships of the United States Navy:

 was launched on 18 August 1813 and sold in 1824
 was launched at Fell's Point in 1831 as Sarah Ann; the US Navy purchased her and renamed Sylph on 26 April 1831. She was lost at sea the same year
 was purchased in 1898; commissioned the same year serving as the Presidential Yacht until sold in 1929
 was acquired by the US Navy in 1940 and sold in December 1946

United States Navy ship names